The 1973 PGA Tour season was played from January 4 to December 1. The season consisted of 48 official money events. Jack Nicklaus won the most tournaments, seven, and there were seven first-time winners. The tournament results and award winners are listed below.

Schedule
The following table lists official events during the 1973 season.

Unofficial events
The following events were sanctioned by the PGA Tour, but did not carry official money, nor were wins official.

Awards

Notes

External links
PGA Tour official site
1973 season coverage at golfstats.com

PGA Tour seasons
PGA Tour